Artyom Sergeyevich Isik (born 28 April 2002) is a Russian football player. He plays for PFC Dynamo Stavropol.

Club career
He made his debut for the main squad of FC Rostov on 27 October 2021 in a Russian Cup game against FC Torpedo Moscow. He made his Russian Premier League debut for Rostov on 11 December 2021 against FC Ural Yekaterinburg.

Career statistics

References

External links
 
 
 
 

2002 births
Living people
Russian footballers
Association football midfielders
FC Rostov players
FC Dynamo Stavropol players
FC KAMAZ Naberezhnye Chelny players
Russian Premier League players
Russian First League players
Russian Second League players